93 Park Lane is a Grade I listed house in Park Lane, Mayfair, London W1.

It was Grade I listed in 1958.

Together with no 94, it was rebuilt on a speculative basis in 1823-25 by Samuel Baxter, and replaced the then King's Head pub at the corner and the previous No. 24 Upper Grosvenor Street.

The new house was initially called No. 1 Grosvenor Gate, and was bought by the politician Wyndham Lewis for £14,000 in February 1827.

Lewis had married Mary Anne, daughter of John Evans, in 1816. They had no children, and he died in 1838, and left his wife a life interest in the house. In 1839, she married the future Prime Minister Benjamin Disraeli, and they lived there until her death in 1872.

Later residents include Thomas Agar-Robartes, 6th Viscount Clifden from 1889 to 1896, and Arthur Hornby Lewis, iron-master, from 1900 to 1926. The Grosvenor Estate purchased the lease in 1931, and it has been offices since 1936.

References

Grade I listed buildings in the City of Westminster
Grade I listed houses in London
Houses completed in 1825
Houses in the City of Westminster
Regency architecture in London